GP Laguna is a men's one-day cycle race which takes place in Croatia. It is rated by the UCI as a 1.2 event and forms part of the UCI Europe Tour.

Winners

References

 
Cycle races in Croatia
Winter events in Croatia